George Boseman is an American actor, comedian and screenplay writer. He is perhaps best known for performed voice impersonations of celebrities and TV roles. In 2015, Boseman performed Snoop Dogg impersonation in the CollegeHumor web series, written by Emily Axford and Pat Cassels, directed by Matthew Pollock and Bill Bergen. Highlights as a television writer includes Media Wars, Pilot, The Late Show with Stephen Colbert, Plastic Cup Boyz, Red Means Go, InAPPropriate Comedy and Katt Williams Presents: Katthouse Comedy. He has also acted in TV episodes and movies such as 30 Rock, Living and Active, Red Mean Go, CollegeHumor's Comedy Music Hall of Fame and Media Wars. Boseman has also produced an episode for Media Wars in 2017.

References

American male voice actors
American male screenwriters